Gravitcornutia recta is a species of moth of the family Tortricidae. It is found in Santa Catarina, Brazil.

The wingspan is 14 mm. The ground colour of the forewings is whitish with blackish suffusions and strigulae (fine streaks). The markings are grey with black marks. The hindwings are brownish grey, but pale basally, with indistinct darker strigulae.

Etymology
The species name refers to simple forewing pattern and is derived from Latin recta (meaning simple).

References

Moths described in 2010
Gravitcornutia
Moths of South America
Taxa named by Józef Razowski